A Promising Africa is a 2014 self-produced documentary film by Zuriel Oduwole.

Background
Released in November 2014 at the Film House Cinema in Lagos, the A Promising Africa series was screened in five countries over three years. A Promising Africa made Oduwole the world's youngest film maker to commercially release a self-produced film.

References

2014 films
Films directed by Zuriel Oduwole
Nigerian documentary films
2010s English-language films